Honorary Captain Vijay Kumar Sharma, AVSM, SM (born 19 August 1985) is an Indian sport shooter. He won the silver medal in the individual 25 metre rapid fire pistol event at the 2012 Summer Olympics. Kumar hails from Barsar village of Hamirpur district of Himachal Pradesh and is a retired Subedar Major (Warrant Officer Class I) in the Dogra Regiment (16th Battalion) Indian Army, who was later promoted to Honorary Captain Rank. Vijay Kumar is supported by the Olympic Gold Quest initiative. He is the only Indian to have won a medal at 25m rapid Fire Pistol . He has been posted at Indian Army Marksmanship Unit (AMU) Mhow since 2003 where he is being coached by the Russian Pavel Smirnov.

Early life and background
Born in Himachal Pradesh, Kumar is the son of Banku Ram, a retired Indian Army subedar, and his wife Roshni Devi. According to his father, while Kumar was "always intrigued" by his father's guns, he only developed his interest in shooting after enlisting in the Indian Army. Kumar joined the Indian Army in 2001 as a sepoy (private), and was inducted into the Army Marksmanship Unit (AMU) at Mhow in 2003. His prowess ensured him a direct promotion from sepoy to havildar (sergeant) by 2006. He was promoted to naib subedar on 20 April 2006.

Shooting career

Early career (2006-2009)
At the 2006 Commonwealth Games, he won two gold medals: the individual 25 meter rapid fire pistol competition and the pairs competition in the same event together with Pemba Tamang. The same year, he won a bronze medal in the Asian Games. In 2006, he was awarded the Arjuna award by the Indian government.

In 2007, he finished second at the Asian Championship in 25 metre center-fire pistol. He also won a silver medal at the 2009 ISSF World Cup Beijing in rapid fire pistol, where he was defeated by 0.1 points. He was promoted to subedar on 10 February 2009 (seniority from 1 July 2008)

Commonwealth and Olympic glory (2010-14)
In the 2010 Commonwealth Games, he won three gold medals and one silver. In 25 metre rapid fire pistol pairs, Gurpreet Singh and Vijay Kumar won the gold medal scoring 1162 points, setting a new Commonwealth games record. He won the 25 meter rapid fire pistol singles event and also teamed up with Harpreet Singh to win the 25-metre center fire pistol pairs event. In the 25-metre centre fire pistol singles, he finished second winning a silver, losing out to fellow Indian Harpreet Singh.

Kumar won the Silver Medal in the 25 m rapid fire pistol event at 2012 London Olympics. He finished with an average score of 9.767 and had a score of 293 with 7 inner 10s in the first stage. Vijay's silver was the second medal for India at London 2012. Earlier Kumar failed to qualify for the men's 10 m air pistol finals after finishing 31st on 28 July 2012.

Kumar was chosen to be the Indian flagbearer at the 2014 Commonwealth Games. The Indian trio of Vijay Kumar, Pemba Tamang and Gurpreet Singh won the silver medal in the 25m center fire event at the 2014 Asian Games, held at Incheon, South Korea. The team scored a total of 1740, two behind gold medalists China.

Later career
Vijay Kumar retired from the army in 2017, after 15 years of service. As of 2019, he is finishing a bachelor's degree in Business Administration from Manav Rachna University in Faridabad, and has been offered a direct-entry position as deputy superintendent of police (DSP) by the Himachal Pradesh state government.

Performance timelines

25 metre rapid fire pistol

25 metre center-fire pistol

25-metre standard pistol

10 metre air pistol

Awards and recognition
 Arjuna Award (2007)
 Rajiv Gandhi Khel Ratna (2012)
 Ati Vishisht Seva Medal (2013)  
 Padma Shri (2013)

For winning the silver medal at 2012 London Olympics:
Promotion from subedar to subedar-major on 12 August 2012. 
 cash award by the Government of Himachal Pradesh 
 by the Government of Rajasthan.

Medal bar

References

External links
 http://www.indianshooting.com
Kumar's profile at ISSF 
 Vijay Kumar Opentalk with Ashwani Jain
 A blogpost on Vijay Kumar posted just before he won the Silver medal at the London Olympics 2012

Indian male sport shooters
ISSF pistol shooters
Living people
Commonwealth Games gold medallists for India
Shooters at the 2006 Commonwealth Games
Recipients of the Arjuna Award
Shooters at the 2010 Commonwealth Games
People from Hamirpur, Himachal Pradesh
People from Mhow
Sport shooters from Himachal Pradesh
Asian Games medalists in shooting
Shooters at the 2012 Summer Olympics
Olympic shooters of India
Indian Army officers
1985 births
Olympic silver medalists for India
Olympic medalists in shooting
Medalists at the 2012 Summer Olympics
Recipients of the Khel Ratna Award
Shooters at the 2006 Asian Games
Shooters at the 2010 Asian Games
Shooters at the 2014 Asian Games
Recipients of the Padma Shri in sports
Shooters at the 2014 Commonwealth Games
Asian Games gold medalists for India
Asian Games silver medalists for India
Asian Games bronze medalists for India
Commonwealth Games silver medallists for India
Commonwealth Games medallists in shooting
Medalists at the 2006 Asian Games
Medalists at the 2010 Asian Games
Medalists at the 2014 Asian Games
Medallists at the 2006 Commonwealth Games
Medallists at the 2010 Commonwealth Games